Huang Zhuo (born 13 August 1985) is a Chinese woman cricketer. She captained the Chinese women's cricket team during the 2015 ICC Women's World Twenty20 Qualifier. She also represented China at the 2010 Asian Games and in the 2014 Asian Games. She made her Women's Twenty20 International (WT20I) debut for China on 18 February 2019 against Thailand, in the 2019 ICC Women's Qualifier Asia tournament.

References

External links 

Profile at CricHQ
Profile at PCB

1985 births
Living people
Chinese women cricketers
China women Twenty20 International cricketers
Cricketers at the 2010 Asian Games
Cricketers at the 2014 Asian Games
Asian Games competitors for China
Women cricket captains
21st-century Chinese women